The 1921 World Chess Championship was played between José Raúl Capablanca and Emanuel Lasker. It was played in Capablanca's native Havana from March 18 to April 28. Capablanca won the match by a score of 9-5 (4 wins, 0 losses, 10 draws) to become the third World Chess Champion.

Background
Partly due to World War I, negotiations for this match took nearly 10 years. Lasker had been the World Champion since 1894, and had successfully defended his world title five times, most recently in 1910.

In 1911, 22-year-old Capablanca won the San Sebastián chess tournament ahead of most of the world's leading players apart from Lasker. Later that year he challenged Lasker to a match for the world title. Lasker was unwilling to play the traditional first-to-win-ten-games-type of match in the semi-tropical conditions of Havana, especially as drawn games were becoming more frequent and the match might last for over six months. He therefore made a counter-proposal: if neither player had a lead of at least two games by the end of the match, it should be considered a draw; the match should be limited to the best of thirty games, counting draws; except that if either player won six games and led by at least two games before thirty games were completed, he should be declared the winner; the champion should decide the venue and stakes, and should have the exclusive right to publish the games; the challenger should deposit a forfeit of US$2,000 (equivalent to roughly $343,000 in 2022 values, based on income value); the time limit should be twelve moves per hour; play should be limited to two sessions of 2½ hours each per day, five days a week. Capablanca objected to the time limit, the short playing times, the thirty-game limit, and especially the requirement that he must win by two games to claim the title, which he regarded as unfair. Lasker took offence at the terms in which Capablanca criticized the two-game lead condition and broke off negotiations, and until 1914 Lasker and Capablanca were not on speaking terms. However, at the St. Petersburg 1914 chess tournament, Capablanca proposed a set of rules for the conduct of World Championship matches, which were accepted by all the leading players, including Lasker.

In 1912, Akiba Rubinstein emerged as a potential challenger when he won the three strongest tournaments that year, at San Sebastian, Breslau and Pistyan. Late in 1912, Lasker entered into negotiations for a world title match with Rubinstein, and the two players agreed to play a match if Rubinstein could raise the funds. Rubinstein had difficulty finding the money; eventually a match was arranged for October 1914, but it did not take place because of the outbreak of World War I. However, Rubinstein's relatively poor showing at the St. Petersburg 1914 chess tournament in April and May (Lasker 1st, Capablanca 2nd, Rubinstein 7th) meant that Capablanca was again seen as the more deserving challenger.

The war from 1914 to 1918 prevented any World Championship during that time.

Negotiations resumed with Capablanca in 1920. Lasker resigned the title in 1920 in a dispute over match conditions, and named Capablanca as his successor. Judging by chess publications of the time, there was little acceptance for Capablanca becoming champion this way: the feeling was that Lasker could resign the world title, but he had no right to name Capablanca as champion. Later in 1920, Lasker agreed to play the 1921 match, as the challenger.

Results

The championship was set to last for 24 games: the first player to accumulate 12½ points (or win eight games) would be World Champion. If it ended 12–12, Capablanca would be world champion, as Lasker was considered the challenger.

{| class="wikitable" style="text-align:center"
|+World Chess Championship Match 1921
|-
! !! 1 !! 2 !! 3 !! 4 !! 5 !! 6 !! 7 !! 8 !! 9 !! 10 !! 11 !! 12 !! 13 !! 14 !! Wins!! Points
|-
| align=left | 
| ½ ||style="background:black; color:white"| ½ || ½ ||style="background:black; color:white"| ½ || 1 ||style="background:black; color:white"| ½ || ½ ||style="background:black; color:white"| ½ || ½ ||style="background:black; color:white"| 1 || 1 ||style="background:black; color:white"| ½ || ½ ||style="background:black; color:white"| 1 || 4|| 9
|-
| align=left | 
|style="background:black; color:white"| ½ || ½ ||style="background:black; color:white"| ½ || ½ ||style="background:black; color:white"| 0 || ½ ||style="background:black; color:white"| ½ || ½ ||style="background:black; color:white"| ½ || 0 || style="background:black; color:white"| 0 || ½ ||style="background:black; color:white"| ½ || 0 || 0||5
|}

Lasker resigned the match after the 14th game, making Capablanca the new champion.

References

External links
Graeme Cree's chess pages

1921
1921 in chess
1921 in Cuba
Chess in Cuba
Sport in Havana
20th century in Havana